Dave Chappelle's Block Party, also known as Block Party, is a 2005 American documentary film hosted and written by comedian Dave Chappelle, and directed by Michel Gondry.

The film and its soundtrack are dedicated to the memory of music producer J Dilla who died of lupus one month before the film's release. The film was officially released at the 2005 Toronto International Film Festival. The film grossed $12.1 million in the box office and debuted at #6 in its opening weekend, grossing $6 million in 1,200 theaters.

Plot

The film follows Chappelle during the summer of 2004, ending on September 18, 2004, when he threw a block party on the corner of Quincy Street and Downing Street in the Clinton Hill neighborhood of Brooklyn, New York City. The film features nearby sites, including the Broken Angel House in Clinton Hill, Brooklyn as well as areas in Fort Greene, Brooklyn and Bedford-Stuyvesant, Brooklyn. The film was produced before Chappelle's highly publicized decision to walk away from a $50 million deal to continue his hit Chappelle's Show, and gained prominence after the announcement.

Chappelle invited several hip hop and neo-soul musical artists to perform at the party, including Kanye West, Mos Def, Jill Scott, Erykah Badu, and The Roots along with The Central State University Marching Band. Lauryn Hill was also scheduled to perform at the party, but since Columbia Records refused to release her songs for use in the production, she decided instead to reunite The Fugees for the occasion. In addition, Chappelle performed comedy monologues and sketches in between the musical acts. Unbeknownst to the world, a young unsigned J. Cole was in the crowd watching as the legendary hip hop duo Black Star performed.

Performers

 Dave Chappelle
 Kanye West
 Mos Def
 Talib Kweli
 Jill Scott
 Erykah Badu
 The Roots
 Common
 Big Daddy Kane
 Kool G Rap
 The Fugees
 Bilal
 Dead Prez
 Cody Chesnutt
 John Legend
 Central State University Marching Band
 A-Trak

Soundtrack

A compilation of "music from and inspired by" the film was released on March 14, 2006.

The album was released by Geffen Records, and produced by Corey Smyth for Blacksmith Music Corp and Questlove.

 Dead Prez – "Hip Hop"
 Black Star – "Definition"
 Jill Scott – "Golden"
 Mos Def – "Universal Magnetic"
 Talib Kweli feat. Erykah Badu – "The Blast"
 Common feat. Erykah Badu & Bilal – "The Light"
 The Roots feat. Big Daddy Kane & Kool G Rap – "Boom!"
 Erykah Badu – "Back in the Day"
 Jill Scott – "The Way"
 Mos Def – "UMI Says"
 The Roots feat. Erykah Badu & Jill Scott – "You Got Me"
 Black Star – "Born & Raised"

All the songs were recorded live in concert, except "Born & Raised", an exclusive new studio track from Mos Def and Talib Kweli's Black Star. Many performances, including The Fugees' reunion and Kanye West's performance, could not be included due to legal restraints with the groups' record labels.

Chappelle's version of Thelonious Monk's "'Round Midnight" was featured in the film, but was not released on the compilation.

Cody chesnuTT  was featured in the film with his song ″Parting Ways″ among others, was not released on the compilation but is shown on the end credits.

Release

Box office
The film grossed $11,718,595 in the United States and an additional $333,329 overseas, giving the film a total gross of $12,051,924; based on a $3 million budget, the film was a moderate success. The DVD has sold a total of 1,240,405 copies since 2006, grossing a total of $18,776,445.

Critical response
Rotten Tomatoes gives the film a 92% "Certified Fresh" rating based on 128 reviews with an average score of 7.70/10. The site's critical consensus reads: "Dave Chappelle's Block Party is a raucous return to the spotlight for the comic, buoyed by witty, infectious humor and outstanding musical performances." Metacritic, which assigns a normalized rating out of 100 to reviews from mainstream critics, gives the film an average score of 84 based on 30 reviews, indicating "universal acclaim".

References

External links
 
 
 
 
 

2005 films
2005 documentary films
Films directed by Michel Gondry
American documentary films
2005 comedy films
Concert films
2000s English-language films
Focus Features films
Central State University
Fugees
2000s hip hop films
2000s American films
Dave Chappelle